The 1949 Iowa State Teachers Panthers football team represented Iowa State Teachers College in the North Central Conference during the 1949 college football season. In its 12th season under head coach Clyde Starbeck, the team compiled a 5–2 record (5–1 against NCC opponents) and tied for the conference championship.

Seven players were named to the all-conference team: halfbacks Chuck Cacek and Paul DeVan; tackles Stanley Brown, Robert Orgren, and Lee Wachenheim; center Don Abney; and guard Bob Miller.

Schedule

References

Iowa State Teachers
Northern Iowa Panthers football seasons
North Central Conference football champion seasons
Iowa State Teachers Panthers football